The Municipality of Leichhardt was a local government area in the inner-west region of Sydney, New South Wales, Australia. On 12 May 2016, Leichhardt merged with Marrickville Council and the Municipality of Ashfield to form the Inner West Council.

The last mayor of the Leichhardt Municipal Council was Cr. Darcy Byrne, a member of Labor Party.

In December 2021, a majority of voters in Inner West Council voted in favour of reversing the 2016 merger and separating the three pre-existing councils of Ashfield, Leichhardt and Marrickville.

Suburbs in the local government area
Suburbs in the Municipality of Leichhardt were:

Demographics
At the 2011 Census, there were  people in the Leichhardt local government area, of these 47.4% were male and 52.6% were female. Aboriginal and Torres Strait Islander people made up 1.0% of the population. The median age of people in the Municipality of Leichhardt was 37 years. Children aged 0 – 14 years made up 16.8% of the population and people aged 65 years and over made up 10.3% of the population. Of people in the area aged 15 years and over, 40.9% were married and 12.6% were either divorced or separated.

Population in the Municipality of Leichhardt between the 2001 Census and the 2006 Census decreased by 20.2%. This was due to an alteration of the boundary between Leichhardt and the Sydney local government areas that took effect in 2003. The suburbs of Glebe, Forest Lodge and parts of Annandale were transferred from Leichhardt to the City of Sydney. In the subsequent five years from the 2006 Census to the 2011 Census, population growth was 7.02%. When compared with total population growth of Australia in the most recent Census, being 8.32%, population growth in the Leichhardt local government area was slightly lower than the national average. The median weekly income for residents within the Municipality of Leichhardt was significantly higher than the national average.

As at the 2011 Census, the Municipality of Leichhardt had approximately double the national and state average of people who spoke Italian at home; and just under double the New South Wales average of people who claimed Italian ancestry.

Council

Leichhardt Municipal Council was composed of twelve Councillors elected proportionally as four separate wards, each electing three councillors. All councillors were elected for a fixed four-year term of office, with the mayor elected annually by the councillors at the first meeting of the council. The last election was held on 8 September 2012, and the final makeup of the council was as follows:

History
The Municipality of Leichhardt operates over land that prehistorically belonged to the Gadigal and Wangal people, of the Eora nation. It has a long cultural heritage that comes from its Sydney Harbour location and its old suburb origins.

He later famously vanished without trace on his attempt to cross the continent from the Darling Downs to the Swan River Colony on the Western Australia coast.

Leichhardt was proclaimed a municipality on 29 December 1871. In 1893, the East Ward of the Municipality separated and became the Borough of Annandale. In 1949, it was merged with the municipalities of Annandale and Balmain. In 1967, the municipal boundary was altered to include Glebe and parts of Camperdown. In 2003, the municipal boundary was again changed, to exclude the Annandale Foreshore (land between The Crescent and Rozelle Bay), Glebe and Forest Lodge, which are now part of the City of Sydney. Since the middle of the 20th century, Leichhardt has been a centre for Sydney's Italian community.

Leichhardt is also home to the first non-government women's health centre to be established in Australia. On International Women's Day 1974, the Leichhardt Women's Community Health Centre opened as a result of grass-roots lobbying from women in the community and Sydney's Women's Liberation Movement. Initially funded through Federal Government funds, the centre is now funded mainly by the NSW Health and continues to run multi-disciplinary health care clinics and health education from its base in Leichhardt and in outreach locations throughout Sydney's inner west.

Amalgamation
On 12 May 2016 Leichhardt Council was dissolved and merged with neighbours Municipality of Ashfield and Marrickville Council to form the Inner West Council.

Parks and recreation
Leichhardt Park, which includes the Leichhardt Park Aquatic Centre is in Lilyfield, as is Leichhardt Oval in Mary Street, the homeground of the Wests Tigers.

The Bay Run around Iron Cove is a popular bicycling, walking and running track, passing along the foreshore of Lilyfield and Rozelle, and linking to paths along Hawthorne Canal on the western border of Leichhardt.

Callan Park in Lilyfield, bordering Iron Cove, offers open space for walking, cycling and passive recreation.

Pioneer Memorial Park in Norton St, Leichhardt, has gardens and paths for passive recreation. It is built on the site of Balmain Cemetery.

Illoura, Ballast Point and Yarulbin Parks have superb Harbour locations in the Balmain Peninsular.

References

Footnotes
 Census data for 2001 contains information for the suburbs of Glebe, Forest Lodge and parts of Annandale that were transferred from Leichhardt to the City of Sydney in 2003.

External links
 Leichhardt Municipal Council website

Leichhardt
Leichhardt
Leichhardt
Inner West